Diaphus thiollierei, the Thiolliere's lanternfish, is a species of lanternfish 
found in the Indo-Pacific.

Size

Etymology
The fish is named in honor of Victor Joseph de l’Isle Thiollière (1801–1859), a French civil engineer, geologist and paleoichthyologist, who reported on the fishes collected by French priest and biologist Xavier Montrouzier (1820–1897) from the Woodlark Archipelago in Papua, New Guinea in 1857

References

Myctophidae
Taxa named by Henry Weed Fowler
Fish described in 1934